The Mount Arlington School District is a community public school district that serves students in kindergarten through eighth grade from Mount Arlington, in Morris County, New Jersey, United States.

As of the 2018–19 school year, the district, comprising two schools, had an enrollment of 362 students and 35.9 classroom teachers (on an FTE basis), for a student–teacher ratio of 10.1:1.

The district is classified by the New Jersey Department of Education as being in District Factor Group "GH", the third-highest of eight groupings. District Factor Groups organize districts statewide to allow comparison by common socioeconomic characteristics of the local districts. From lowest socioeconomic status to highest, the categories are A, B, CD, DE, FG, GH, I and J.

For ninth through twelfth grades, students attend Roxbury High School in Roxbury, as part of a sending/receiving relationship with the Roxbury School District. As of the 2018–19 school year, the high school had an enrollment of 1,297 students and 125.9 classroom teachers (on an FTE basis), for a student–teacher ratio of 10.3:1.

Schools
Schools in the district (with 2018–19 enrollment from the National Center for Education Statistics) are: 
Schools
Edith M. Decker School (with 111 students in Kindergarten through grade 2 ,including a pre-school disabilities program). Along with classrooms, the facility contains a computer lab and a children's library.
Mount Arlington Public School (with 249 students in grades 3-8). The facility contains a computer lab, an art and music classrooms, and a media center.

Both schools are located along the eastern bank of Lake Hopatcong.

Administration
Core members of the district's administration are:
Monica Rowland, Superintendent
Tonya M. Flowers, Business Administrator / Board Secretary
Jeff Grillo, Principal

Board of education
The district's board of education, with nine members, sets policy and oversees the fiscal and educational operation of the district through its administration. As a Type II school district, the board's trustees are elected directly by voters to serve three-year terms of office on a staggered basis, with three seats up for election each year held (since 2012) as part of the November general election. The board appoints a superintendent to oversee the day-to-day operation of the district.

References

External links
Mount Arlington School District

Mount Arlington School District, National Center for Education Statistics

Mount Arlington, New Jersey
New Jersey District Factor Group GH
School districts in Morris County, New Jersey